Stanley P. V. Arnold (September 15, 1856–February 1, 1901) was an American newspaper editor and politician.

Arnold was born on a farm in Jefferson County, Ohio. He went to the National Normal University in Lebanon, Ohio and taught school. He was involved with a trade paper in St. Louis, Missouri. In 1881, he became the editor and publisher of the Springfield Daily News in Springfield, Illinois. He was also involved with the printing, engraving, and publishing business. Arnold lived in Springfield with his wife and family. Arnold served in the Illinois House of Representatives in 1899 and 1900 ad was a Democrat and a Populist. He died from complications from the influenza in Springfield, Illinois.

Notes

External links

1856 births
1901 deaths
People from Jefferson County, Ohio
Politicians from Springfield, Illinois
National Normal University alumni
Editors of Illinois newspapers
American engravers
American printers
Illinois Populists
Democratic Party members of the Illinois House of Representatives
Deaths from influenza
19th-century American politicians
19th-century American businesspeople